Sator is a Swedish rock band. The band was founded in Borlänge as Sator Codex in 1981. Sator Codex released one album, "Wanna Start A Fire?" and three singles before shortening their name in 1987 and continuing without their previous lead singer Björn Clarin and changing their sound. Chips Kiesbye is also a successful producer and has worked with The Hellacopters, Sahara Hotnights, Millencolin and several other rock bands.

Members
 Kent Norberg: lead vocals, guitar
 Chips Kiesbye: lead vocals, guitar
 Hans Gäfvert: keyboards, samples
 Heikki Kiviaho: bass, backing vocals
 Michael Solén: drums

Discography

Albums
 Slammer! (1988)
 Stock Rocker Nuts! (1990)
 Headquake (1992)
 Barbie-Q-Killers Vol. 1 (1994)
 Stereo (1995)
 Musical Differences (1998)
 Basement Noise (2006)
 Under the Radar (2011)
 Return of the Barbie-Q-Killers (2022) – No. 14 Sweden

Singles
 "Oh Mama" (1988) – Lili & Susie cover
 "World" (1990)
 "Restless Again" (1990)
 "Hello Hello! (I'm Back Again)" (1990) – Gary Glitter cover
 "We're Right, You're Wrong" (1992)
 "I Wanna Go Home" (1992)
 "Ring Ring" (1993) – ABBA cover
 "I'd Rather Drink Than Talk" (1993)
 "No Solution" (1994) – The Nuns cover
 "I'll Wait" (1994) – The Suicide Commandos cover
 "Nothing Hurts" (1994)
 "Out of the Void" (1995)
 "This Is My Life" (1995) – Gasolin' cover
 "Even as We Speak" (1995)
 "It Really Doesn't Matter Now" (1995)
 "I'm Gone" (1995)
 "Everybody's Making Plans" (1998)
 "Love MF" (1998)
 "TV-Night" (1999)
 "Droppin' Out!" (1999)
 Leksands EP:n (2009)
 "I Wanna Go Home (Twenty-Ten)" (2010)
 "World Keeps Turning" (2013)
 "When You Lie Down with Dogs" (2014)

Split single
 Sator vs White Flag (1994)
 Sator / Gangbangers (1996)

DVDs
 Live at Sticky Fingers 2006 (2007)

Other recordings
 "Ring Ring" – ABBA cover from 1992 Swedish ABBA tribute album "ABBA: The Tribute", released on the Polar Music label

References

External links
 Official Website

Artists from Dalarna